Benjamin Dieudé-Fauvel (born 26 August 1986) is a French retired professional ice hockey defenceman.

Playing career
Undrafted and in the 2014–15 season, Dieude-Fauvel earned his first recall to the American Hockey League in his sixth North American season, playing 20 games with the Iowa Wild. Unsigned over the summer, Dieude-Fauvel opted to continue in the ECHL in agreeing to a one-year contract with the Evansville IceMen on 8 September 2015. During the 2015–16 season, Dieude-Fauvel was unable to cement a role and split time between the IceMen, Rapid City Rush and the Kalamazoo Wings.

On August 15, 2015, Dieude-Fauvel opted to return to the Elmira Jackals of the ECHL, signing a one-year deal.

At the conclusion of the 2016–17 season, splitting the year between the Jackals and the Missouri Mavericks, Dieude-Fauvel was released as a free agent. On July 31, 2017, he signed a one-year contract with his seventh ECHL club, the Wheeling Nailers.

International play
Dieude-Fauvel was named to the France men's national ice hockey team for competition at the 2014 IIHF World Championship.

References

External links

1986 births
Living people
Boxers de Bordeaux players
Chamonix HC players
Elmira Jackals (ECHL) players
Evansville IceMen players
French ice hockey defencemen
Gothiques d'Amiens players
Iowa Wild players
Kalamazoo Wings (ECHL) players
Laredo Bucks players
Missouri Mavericks players
HC Morzine-Avoriaz players
Quad City Mallards (CHL) players
Quad City Mallards (ECHL) players
Rapid City Rush players
Sportspeople from Bordeaux
Wheeling Nailers players